The men's 100 m breaststroke swimming events for the 2016 Summer Paralympics took place at the Olympic Aquatics Stadium from 8 to 17 September. A total of eleven events were contested for different classifications.

Competition format
Each event consisted of two rounds: heats and final. The top eight swimmers overall in the heats progressed to the final. If there were less than eight swimmers in an event, no heats were held and all swimmers qualify for the final.

Results

SB4

SB5

17:30 11 September 2016:

SB6

17:43 15 September 2016:

SB7

17:30 10 September 2016:

SB8

17:30 14 September 2016:

SB9

18:05 8 September 2016:

SB11

18:44 13 September 2016:

SB12

19:00 13 September 2016:

SB13

18:02 11 September 2016:

SB14

18:06 14 September 2016:

References

Swimming at the 2016 Summer Paralympics